The 2018 Chinese Women's Super League season was the league's 4th season in its current incarnation, and the 22nd total season of the women's association football league in China.

Dalian Quanjian were the defending champions.

Clubs

Club changes

From League One
Teams promoted from 2017 Chinese Women's Football League
 Wuhan Jianghan University
 Henan Huishang

To League One
Teams relegated to 2018 Chinese Women's Football League
 Shandong Sports Lottery

Team withdrawal
 Tianjin Huisen

Stadiums and Locations

Foreign players

 Foreign players who left their clubs or were sent to reserve teams during the season.

League table

Goalscorers
Source: China Women's Football - 中国女足

Notes

References

External links
Season

2018
2017–18 domestic women's association football leagues
2018–19 domestic women's association football leagues
+